Edwin Joseph Keating  (29 October 1910 – 22 October 1987) was a New Zealand Member of Parliament for the Labour Party, academic and director of the Bank of New Zealand.

Biography

Early life and career
Keating was born in Aldershot, England, in 1910 and arrived in New Zealand in 1926 alongside family members. He found employment with the New Zealand Post Office and attended the University of Auckland part-time, eventually graduating with a master of arts majoring in history.

He married Marguerita Mary (Rita) Wigg in Dunedin on 29 March 1948 with whom he had four sons and one daughter.

He was Vice-President of the New Zealand Post Office Association from 1949 to 1954 and a member of the Post Office Promotion Board from 1950 to 1954. He was a member of the Government Superannuation Board from 1948 to 1953.

Political career

At the 1953 local-body elections he stood unsuccessfully for the Wellington Harbour Board on the Labour Party ticket.

Keating represented the Hastings electorate from 1954 to 1960, when he was defeated by National's Duncan MacIntyre. He attempted to regain the seat in 1963, but was unsuccessful. Keating was thought of as a potential cabinet member at the formation of the Second Labour Government. The press thought him the most qualified member of the Labour caucus for the position of Postmaster-General due to his work experience prior to entering Parliament. However he was not selected for cabinet and remained a backbencher. For the duration of the government Keating defended the government's record and countered attacks from the opposition regarding taxation levels. He particularly highlighted the success of the introduction of the Pay-as-you-earn tax (PAYE) as an improvement to the tax system in place prior to Labour taking office.

He was a member of the Labour Party's national executive from 1957 to 1960 and chairman of the Wellington Labour Party Division from 1968 to 1975. In 1969 Keating stood for the vice-presidency of the Labour Party. He gained minimal support with only 2 delegates voting for him in the ballot.

Later career
After politics he became a tutor and senior lecturer in industrial relations at Victoria University of Wellington. Keating also served as a director of the Bank of New Zealand from 1975 to 1987. He had previously been a member of the bank's housing allocation committee from 1947 to 1960.

In the 1986 Queen's Birthday Honours, Keating was appointed a Companion of the Order of St Michael and St George, for public and community services.

Death
He died in 1987 in Wellington a week before his 77th birthday after a lengthy illness. He was survived by his wife, five children and three grandchildren.

Notes

References

Honoured by the Queen by Alister Taylor

1910 births
1987 deaths
University of Auckland alumni
Academic staff of the Victoria University of Wellington
New Zealand Labour Party MPs
English emigrants to New Zealand
New Zealand MPs for North Island electorates
New Zealand Companions of the Order of St Michael and St George
Members of the New Zealand House of Representatives
Unsuccessful candidates in the 1960 New Zealand general election
Unsuccessful candidates in the 1963 New Zealand general election